Uexküll (also Üxküll or Yxkull) is the historic German name of Ikšķile, a town in Latvia. It is also the name of a Baltic-German noble family. Uexküll was originally a Bremen noble family whose lineage can be traced to several places, the earliest originating in Stedingen, and later the Baltic States, Sweden, Württemberg, and Baden. After obtaining domain Meyendorff, the branch of Uexkülls family was formed in the third quarter of the 15th century and since then it became known as Meyendorff von Uexküll.

Coat of arms

Bardewisch 
The Bardewisch coat of arms displays two upward facing battle axes, in blue and black. The helmet appears with closed blue-silver covers.

Uexküll 
The Uexküll coat of arms displays a victorious red lion in a golden backdrop. On the two helmets are red-golden covers facing silver sickles with red shanks. These are adorned with natural peacock feathers.

Coat of arms since 1475 
Since 1475 the coat of arms has shown the shields of both the Bardewisch and Uexküll. This is achieved by placing the two side by side with the Uexküll shield on the left and the Bardewisch shield to the right. The helmet, adorned with peacock feathers and centered between two sickles, is split in two, the left of the helmet displaying the red and gold of Uexküll, and the right the colours of Bardewisch.

Notable members
 Alexander Rudolf Karl von Uexküll (1829–1891), politician, mayor of Reval (1878–1883)
 Alexandrine Gräfin von Üxküll-Gyllenband (1873–1963), Matron within the German Red Cross
 Berend Johann von Uexküll (1671–1676), Captain within the Estonian Knighthood
 Berend Johann von Uexküll (1806–1809), Captain within the Estonian Knighthood
 Bernhard Graf Uxkull-Gyllenband (1899–1918), German poet
 Friedrich Johann Emich von Üxküll-Gyllenband (1684–1768), President of the Oberhof Council within the Margrave of Baden-Durlach
 Georg Detloff von Uexküll (1668–1710), Captain within the Estonian Knighthood
 Gertrud Schwend-Uexküll (1867–1901), women's rights activist and education pioneer
 Gösta von Uexküll (1909–1993), writer and journalist
 Jakob Johann von Uexkül (1864–1944), biologist, zoologist, and philosopher
 Jakob von Uexkull (born 1944), founder of Right Livelihood Award
 Johann von Uexküll (died 1583), Danish Governor of Ösel
 Karl Friedrich Emich von Uexküll-Gyllenband (1755–1832), art critic and collector in Württemberg
 Nikolaus von Üxküll-Gyllenband (1877–1944), businessman, and Colonel in the German Resistance
 Jens Ole von Uexkuell (born 1978), German fencer
 Ole von Uexküll (born 1978), Swedish activist
 Otto von Uexküll (died 1601), Swedish Field marshal
 Otto von Uexküll (died 1650), Captain within the Estonian Knighthood
 Thure von Uexküll (1908–2004), Doctor, scholar of psychosomatic medicine and biosemiotics
 Woldemar Graf Uxkull-Gyllenband (1898–1939), German historian
 Richard von Yxkull (born 1967), chairman of Hammarby Fotboll, one of Sweden's biggest football clubs

References

Swedish noble families
Swedish noble families
Lower Saxon noble families
Württembergian noble families